A list of films produced in South Korea in 2004:

Box office
The highest-grossing South Korean films released in 2004, by domestic box office gross revenue, are as follows:

A–F

G–Z

References

External links
 2004 in South Korea
 2004 in South Korean music

 2004 at www.koreanfilm.org

2004
Box
South Korean